Cara Black and Liezel Huber were the defending champions and won in the final by beating Raquel Kops-Jones and Abigail Spears.

Seeds

Draw

Draw

References
 2009 DFS Classic Draws
 ITF Tournament Page
 ITF doubles results page

Aegon Classic - Doubles
Aegon Classic - Doubles
Doubles